The year 1937 in film involved some significant events, including the Walt Disney production of the first American full-length animated film, Snow White and the Seven Dwarfs.

Top-grossing films (U.S.)
The top ten 1937 released films by box office gross in North America are as follows:

Events
 January 29 – The Good Earth premieres in the U.S.
 April 16 – Way Out West premieres in the US.
 May 7 – Shall We Dance premieres in the US.
 May 11 – Captains Courageous premieres in New York. The film is released nationwide on June 25.
 Monogram Pictures, who had merged with Republic Pictures two years earlier, decide to separate and distribute their own films again.
 June 7 – Jean Harlow, one of the biggest Hollywood stars of the decade, dies aged 26 at Good Samaratan Hospital in Los Angeles. The official cause of death is listed as cerebral edema, a complication of kidney failure.
 June 11 – A Day at the Races premieres in the U.S.
 July 9  – The silent film archives of Fox Film Corporation are destroyed by the 1937 Fox vault fire.
 July 23 – Six weeks after Jean Harlow's death, her final film, Saratoga, is released. It is an instant box office success and becomes the highest-grossing film of Harlow's career.
 December 21 – Snow White and the Seven Dwarfs premieres at the Carthay Circle Theatre in Los Angeles. The film is a massive box office success and briefly holds the record as the highest-grossing sound film of all time.

Academy Awards

 Best Picture: The Life of Emile Zola – Warner Bros.
 Best Director: Leo McCarey – The Awful Truth
 Best Actor: Spencer Tracy – Captains Courageous
 Best Actress: Luise Rainer – The Good Earth
 Best Supporting Actor: Joseph Schildkraut – The Life of Emile Zola
 Best Supporting Actress: Alice Brady – In Old Chicago

Top ten money-making stars

1937 film releases

January–March
January 1937
13 January
Thunder in the City (GB)
14 January
Action for Slander
17 January
Battle of Greed
26 January
Without Dowry (U.S.S.R.)
28 January
Pépé le Moko (France)
29 January
The Good Earth
You Only Live Once
30 January
Black Legion
February 1937
2 February
Dreaming Lips (Britain)
4 February
The Daughter of the Samurai (Germany/Japan)
12 February
Head Over Heels (GB)
On the Avenue
13 February
The Great O'Malley
18 February
Lost Horizon
19 February
The Last of Mrs. Cheyney
March 1937
3 March
Maid of Salem
5 March
Fire Over England (GB)
History is Made at Night
Jump for Glory (GB)
12 March
A Family Affair
Nancy Steele Is Missing!
22 March
Layla and Majnun (Iran)
25 March
Seventh Heaven
26 March
Maytime
Quality Street
27 March
Girl Loves Boy

April–June
April 1937
5 April
Elephant Boy (GB)
9 April
The Soldier and the Lady
10 April
Marked Woman
The Tale of the Fox (Germany)
16 April
Way Out West
18 April
Love from a Stranger (GB)
20 April
A Star Is Born
23 April
The Woman I Love
28 April
Woman Chases Man
30 April
Night Must Fall
May 1937
7 May
Shall We Dance
They Gave Him a Gun
8 May
The Prince and the Pauper
9 May
Make Way for Tomorrow
The Vicar of Bray
19 May
Academy Award Review of Walt Disney Cartoons
21 May
Charlie Chan at the Olympics
Pick a Star
26 May
Kid Galahad
28 May
This Is My Affair
June 1937
1 June
Knight Without Armour (GB)
The Road Back
4 June
Parnell
8 June
Grand Illusion (GB)
11 June
A Day at the Races
12 June
Storm in a Teacup (GB)
17 June
King Solomon's Mines (GB)
23 June
Slim
25 June
Captains Courageous
Wee Willie Winkie
30 June
Silver Blaze

July–September
July 1937
6 July
The Edge of the World (GB)
7 July
Easy Living
14 July
They Won't Forget
15 July
Ever Since Eve
16 July
Topper
21 July
High, Wide, and Handsome
23 July
Saratoga
24 July
Street Angel (China)
August 1937
3 August
You Can't Have Everything
4 August
Artists and Models
6 August
Stella Dallas
9 August
Souls at Sea
11 August
The Life of Emile Zola
19 August
Confession
20 August
Broadway Melody of 1938
25 August
Humanity and Paper Balloons (Japan)
27 August
Dead End
31 August
To New Shores (Germany)
September 1937
1 September
The Firefly
2 September
The Prisoner of Zenda
3 September
Big City
5 September
One Hundred Men and a Girl
7 September
It Happened in Hollywood
10 September
Annapolis Salute
Gribouille (France)
16 September
Victoria the Great (GB)
18 September
That Certain Woman
24 September
Tři vejce do skla (Czechoslovakia)
26 September
The Dybbuk
30 September
Something to Sing About

October–December
October 1937
1 October
Madame X
2 October
Love Is on the Air
8 October
Stage Door
10 October
Law for Tombstone
12 October
Green Fields 
14 October
Think Fast, Mr. Moto
15 October
The Bride Wore Red
Double Wedding
Heidi
20 October
Bizarre, Bizarre (France)
21 October
The Awful Truth
22 October
Conquest
Yoshiwara (France)
23 October
The Perfect Specimen
29 October
Ali Baba Goes to Town
Angel
Stand-In
30 October
The Great Garrick
November 1937
9 November
The Hurricane
12 November
The Last Gangster
19 November
A Damsel in Distress
Navy Blue and Gold
20 November
It's Love I'm After
25 November
Nothing Sacred
December 1937
2 December
Andula Won (Czechoslovakia)
The Seven Ravens (Germany)
4 December
First Lady
7 December
 Telephone Operator
10 December
Born to the West
17 December
Daughter of Shanghai
18 December
La Habanera (Germany)
21 December
Skeleton on Horseback (Czechoslovakia)
Snow White and the Seven Dwarfs
24 December
True Confession
25 December
Tovarich
29 December
You're a Sweetheart
31 December
Wells Fargo
Wise Girl

Notable films released in 1937
United States unless stated.

A
Academy Award Review of Walt Disney Cartoons
Action for Slander, starring Clive Brook and Ann Todd (GB)
Ali Baba Goes to Town, starring Eddie Cantor
Andula Won (Andula vyhrála) (Czechoslovakia)
Angel, directed by Ernst Lubitsch, starring Marlene Dietrich
Annapolis Salute, starring James Ellison
Artists and Models, starring Jack Benny and Ida Lupino
The Awful Truth, directed by Leo McCarey, starring Irene Dunne and Cary Grant

B
Battle of Greed, starring Tom Keene
Bezhin Meadow, directed by Sergei Eisenstein (U.S.S.R.)
Big City, starring Luise Rainer and Spencer Tracy
Bizarre, Bizarre (Drôle de drame ou L'étrange aventure du Docteur Molyneux), directed by Marcel Carné, starring Louis Jouvet and Michel Simon (France)
Black Legion, starring Humphrey Bogart
Born to the West, starring John Wayne
The Bride Wore Red, directed by Dorothy Arzner, starring Joan Crawford
Brief Ecstasy, starring Paul Lukas (GB)
Broadway Melody of 1938, starring Eleanor Powell and Judy Garland

C
Captains Courageous, starring Freddie Bartholomew and Spencer Tracy
Charlie Chan at the Olympics, starring Warner Oland
Confession, starring Kay Francis and Basil Rathbone
Conquest, starring Greta Garbo and Charles Boyer
Crossroads (Shi zi jie tou) (China)

D
A Damsel in Distress, starring Fred Astaire, George Burns and Gracie Allen
The Daughter of the Samurai (Die Tochter des Samurai / Atarashiki tsuchi), directed by Arnold Fanck and Mansaku Itami (Germany/Japan)
Daughter of Shanghai, starring Anna May Wong and Philip Ahn
A Day at the Races, directed by Sam Wood, starring the Marx Brothers
Dead End, directed by William Wyler, starring Sylvia Sidney, Joel McCrea, Humphrey Bogart, Claire Trevor
Double Wedding, starring William Powell and Myrna Loy
Dreaming Lips, directed by Paul Czinner, starring Elisabeth Bergner, Raymond Massey (Britain)
Duniya Na Mane (The Unexpected) (India)
The Dybbuk, Yiddish language film from (Poland)

E
Easy Living, starring Jean Arthur and Edward Arnold
The Edge of the World, directed by Michael Powell (GB)
Elephant Boy, directed by Robert J. Flaherty and Zoltan Korda, starring Sabu (GB)
España 1936, a documentary produced and co-written by Luis Buñuel (Spain)
Ever Since Eve, starring Marion Davies and Robert Montgomery

F
A Family Affair, starring Lewis Stone, Mickey Rooney, Cecilia Parker, Fay Holden
Fire Over England, starring Laurence Olivier and Vivien Leigh (GB)
The Firefly, starring Jeanette MacDonald and Allan Jones
First Lady, starring Kay Francis and Preston Foster

G
Gangway, starring Jessie Matthews (GB)
Girl Loves Boy. starring Eric Linden
The Good Earth, starring Paul Muni and Luise Rainer (Academy Award for Best Actress)
Good Morning, Boys, starring Will Hay (GB)
Grand Illusion, directed by Jean Renoir, starring Jean Gabin and Dita Parlo (France)
The Great Barrier, starring Richard Arlen and Lilli Palmer (GB)
The Great Garrick, starring Brian Aherne and Olivia de Havilland
The Great O'Malley, starring Pat O'Brien and Humphrey Bogart
Green Fields – a Yiddish language film
Gribouille ( The Meddler), starring Raimu and Michèle Morgan (France)

H
La Habanera, directed by Douglas Sirk (Germany)
Head Over Heels, starring Jessie Matthews (GB)
Heidi, starring Shirley Temple
High, Wide, and Handsome, starring Irene Dunne and Randolph Scott
History is Made at Night, starring Charles Boyer and Jean Arthur
 The Hound of the Baskervilles / Der Hund Von Baskerville (German) Sherlock Holmes film directed by Carl Lamac, starring Bruno Guttner as Holmes, and Fritz Odemar as Watson
Humanity and Paper Balloons (Ninjō Kami Fūsen) (Japan)
The Hurricane, starring Dorothy Lamour

I
It Happened in Hollywood, starring Richard Dix and Fay Wray
It's Love I'm After, starring Leslie Howard, Bette Davis, Olivia de Havilland

J
Jump for Glory, directed by Raoul Walsh, starring Douglas Fairbanks Jr. and Valerie Hobson (GB)

K
Kid Galahad, starring Edward G. Robinson, Bette Davis, Humphrey Bogart
King Solomon's Mines, starring Cedric Hardwicke and Paul Robeson (GB)
Knight Without Armour, starring Marlene Dietrich and Robert Donat (GB)

L
Lancashire Luck, film debut of Wendy Hiller (GB)
The Last Gangster, starring Edward G. Robinson and James Stewart
The Last of Mrs. Cheyney, starring Joan Crawford and William Powell
Law for Tombstone, directed by and starring Buck Jones
Layla and Majnun directed by Abdolhossein Sepanta (Iran)
The Life of Emile Zola, starring Paul Muni
Lost Horizon, directed by Frank Capra, starring Ronald Colman and Jane Wyatt
Love from a Stranger, starring Ann Harding and Basil Rathbone (GB)
Love Is on the Air, directed by Nick Grinde, starring Ronald Reagan and June Travis

M
Madame X, starring Gladys George and Warren William
Maid of Salem, starring Claudette Colbert and Fred MacMurray
Make Way for Tomorrow, directed by Leo McCarey, starring Victor Moore and Beulah Bondi
The Man Who Was Sherlock Holmes (Der Mann, der Sherlock Holmes war) (Germany)
Marked Woman, starring Bette Davis and Humphrey Bogart
Maytime, starring Jeanette MacDonald and Nelson Eddy
Morality Above All Else (Mravnost nade vše) (Czechoslovakia)
 Murder at the Baskervilles -- see under Silver Blaze below

N
Nancy Steele Is Missing!, starring Victor McLaglen and Peter Lorre
Navy Blue and Gold, starring Robert Young, James Stewart, Lionel Barrymore
Night Must Fall, starring Robert Montgomery and Rosalind Russell
Nothing Sacred, directed by William Wellman, starring Carole Lombard and Fredric March

O
Oh, Mr Porter!, starring Will Hay (GB)
O-Kay for Sound, starring The Crazy Gang (GB)
The Old Mill, a Silly Symphonies cartoon
On the Avenue, starring Dick Powell and Madeleine Carroll, with songs by Irving Berlin
One Hundred Men and a Girl, starring Deanna Durbin and Leopold Stokowski

P
Parnell, starring Clark Gable and Myrna Loy
Pépé le Moko, directed by Julien Duvivier, starring Jean Gabin (France)
Pick a Star, starring Jack Haley
Popeye the Sailor Meets Ali Baba's Forty Thieves
The Perfect Specimen, starring Errol Flynn, screenplay by the playwright Lawrence Riley et al.
The Prince and the Pauper, starring Errol Flynn
The Prisoner of Zenda, starring Ronald Colman and Madeleine Carroll

Q
Quality Street, starring Katharine Hepburn and Franchot Tone

R
The Road Back, directed by James Whale
Rosalie, starring Eleanor Powell and Nelson Eddy

S
Saratoga, starring Clark Gable and Jean Harlow in her last film
The Seven Ravens (Germany)
Seventh Heaven, starring James Stewart and Simone Simon
Shall We Dance, starring Fred Astaire and Ginger Rogers
Sidewalks of London (a.k.a. St. Martin's Lane), starring Charles Laughton, Vivien Leigh and Rex Harrison (GB)
Il signor Max, starring Vittorio De Sica (Italy)
Silver Blaze (British), a Sherlock Holmes film directed by Thomas Bentley, starring Arthur Wontner as Holmes, Ian Fleming as Watson and Lyn Harding as Moriarty; released in U.S. as Murder at the Baskervilles
Skeleton on Horseback (Bílá nemoc), directed by and starring Hugo Haas (Czechoslovakia)
Slave Ship, starring Warner Baxter and Wallace Beery
Slim, starring Henry Fonda
Snow White and the Seven Dwarfs, first American feature-length animated film. Directed by David Hand, William Cottrell, Wilfred Jackson, Larry Morey, Perce Pearce, and Ben Sharpsteen, starring Adriana Caselotti, Lucille La Verne, Harry Stockwell, Roy Atwell, Pinto Colvig, Otis Harlan, Scotty Mattraw, Billy Gilbert, Eddie Collins, Moroni Olsen, and Stuart Buchanan
The Soldier and the Lady
Something to Sing About, directed by Victor Schertzinger, starring James Cagney, Evelyn Daw, William Frawley
Song at Midnight (Ye ban ge sheng) (China)
Souls at Sea, starring Gary Cooper and George Raft
Stage Door, starring Katharine Hepburn and Ginger Rogers
Stand-In, starring Leslie Howard, Joan Blondell, Humphrey Bogart
A Star Is Born, starring Janet Gaynor and Fredric March
Stella Dallas, starring Barbara Stanwyck
Storm in a Teacup, starring Vivien Leigh and Rex Harrison (GB)
Street Angel (Malu tianshi), starring Zhou Xuan (China)

T
The Tale of the Fox (Germany)
That Certain Woman, starring Bette Davis and Henry Fonda
The Three Garridebs, starring Louis Hector, in the first televised adaptation of the Sherlock Holmes character.
They Gave Him a Gun, starring Spencer Tracy and Gladys George
They Won't Forget, starring Claude Rains
Thin Ice, starring Sonja Henie and Tyrone Power
Think Fast, Mr. Moto, starring Peter Lorre
This Is My Affair, starring Robert Taylor and Barbara Stanwyck
Thunder in the City, starring Edward G. Robinson, Nigel Bruce, Ralph Richardson (GB)
To New Shores, directed by Douglas Sirk, starring Zarah Leander (Germany)
Topper, starring Constance Bennett, Cary Grant, Roland Young
Tovarich, starring Claudette Colbert and Charles Boyer
Tři vejce do skla (Three eggs in a glass) (Czechoslovakia)
True Confession, starring Carole Lombard, Fred MacMurray, John Barrymore

V
The Vicar of Bray, starring Stanley Holloway
Victoria the Great, starring Anna Neagle and Anton Walbrook (GB)

W
Way Out West, starring Stan Laurel and Oliver Hardy
Wee Willie Winkie, starring Shirley Temple
Wells Fargo, starring Joel McCrea
What Did the Lady Forget? (Shukujo wa nani wo wasureta ka), directed by Yasujirō Ozu (Japan)
Wise Girl, starring Miriam Hopkins and Ray Milland
Without Dowry (Bespridannitsa) (U.S.S.R.)
Woman Chases Man, starring Miriam Hopkins and Joel McCrea
The Woman I Love, starring Paul Muni and Miriam Hopkins

Y
Yoshiwara, directed by Max Ophüls, starring Sessue Hayakawa (France)
You Can't Have Everything, starring Alice Faye, Don Ameche, Gypsy Rose Lee
You Only Live Once, starring Henry Fonda and Sylvia Sidney
Young and Innocent, directed by Alfred Hitchcock (GB)
 You're a Sweetheart
You're Only Young Once, starring Lewis Stone, Mickey Rooney, Cecilia Parker, Fay Holden

Z
Znachor (The Miracle Man) (Poland)

Serials
 Blake of Scotland Yard, starring Ralph Byrd and Herbert Rawlinson
 Dick Tracy, starring Ralph Byrd
 Jungle Jim
 Jungle Menace, starring Frank Buck
 The Mysterious Pilot, starring Frank Hawks
 The Painted Stallion, starring Ray Corrigan
 Radio Patrol
 Secret Agent X-9, starring Scott Kolk
 S.O.S. Coast Guard, starring Ralph Byrd and Bela Lugosi
 Tim Tyler's Luck, starring Frankie Thomas
 Wild West Days
 Zorro Rides Again, starring John Carroll

Comedy film series
 Harold Lloyd (1913–1938)
 Charlie Chaplin (1914–1940)
 Lupino Lane (1915–1939)
 Buster Keaton (1917–1944)
 Laurel and Hardy (1921–1945)
 Our Gang (1922–1944)
 Wheeler and Woolsey (1929–1937)
 The Marx Brothers (1929–1946)
 The Three Stooges (1934–1959)

Animated short film series
 Krazy Kat (1925–1940)
 Oswald the Lucky Rabbit (1927–1938)
 Mickey Mouse (1928–1953)
 Silly Symphonies
 Woodland Café
 Little Hiawatha
 The Old Mill
 Screen Songs (1929–1938)
 Looney Tunes (1930–1969)
 Terrytoons (1930–1964)
 Merrie Melodies (1931–1969)
 Scrappy (1931–1941)
 Betty Boop (1932–1939)
 Popeye (1933–1957)
 Happy Harmonies (1934–1938)
 Color Rhapsodies (1934–1949)
 Meany, Miny, and Moe (1936-1937)
 Donald Duck (1937–1956)

Births
 January 4 – Dyan Cannon, American actress
 January 7 – Harvey Evans, American actor (d. 2021)
 January 11 – Felix Silla, Italian actor, musician, stunt artist and voice artist (d. 2021)
 January 12 – Shirley Eaton, English actress and model
 January 14 – Stefano Satta Flores, Italian actor and voice actor (d. 1985)
 January 15 – Margaret O'Brien, American actress
 January 16 – Lorraine Bayly, Australian actress, singer, director and writer
 January 24 – Julie Gregg, American actress (d. 2016)
 January 30 – Vanessa Redgrave, English actress
 January 31 – Suzanne Pleshette, American actress (d. 2008)
 February 1 – Garrett Morris, American comedian, actor and singer
 February 2 – Tom Smothers, American comedian and musician
 February 14 – Soher Al Bably, Egyptian actress (d. 2021)
 February 17 – Benjamin Whitrow, English actor (d. 2017)
 February 19 – David Margulies, American actor (d. 2016)
 February 21 – Gary Lockwood, American actor
 February 25 – Tom Courtenay, English actor
 February 27 – Barbara Babcock, American character actress
 March 2 – BarBara Luna, American actress
 March 5 – Sal Borgese, Italian actor
 March 10 – Joe Viterelli, American actor (d. 2004)
 March 21 – Bill Capizzi, American voice actor (d. 2007)
 March 22 – Angelo Badalamenti, American screen composer (d. 2022)
 March 23 – Tony Burton, American actor (d. 2016) 
 March 30
Warren Beatty, American actor and director
James D. Brubaker, American film producer (d. 2023)
 April 1 – Jordan Charney, American character actor
 April 2 – Ken Olfson, American actor (d. 1997)
 April 3 – Lawrence Dane, Canadian actor and producer (d. 2022)
 April 6 – Billy Dee Williams, American actor
 April 13
Corinne Cole, American actress
Edward Fox, English actor
 April 15
Uldis Pūcītis, Latvian actor (d. 2000) 
Frank Vincent, American actor (d. 2017) 
 April 19 – Elinor Donahue, American actress
 April 20 – George Takei, American actor, author and activist
 April 22 – Jack Nicholson, American actor
 April 27 – Sandy Dennis, American actress (d. 1992)
 May 5 – John Martino, American actor
 May 8 – Shin Seong-il, South Korean actor (d. 2018)
 May 12
George Carlin, American stand-up comedian, actor, social critic and author (d. 2008)
Susan Hampshire, English actress
 May 13 – Zohra Lampert, American actress 
 May 16 – Yvonne Craig, American actress (d. 2015)
 May 19 – Pat Roach, English actor and professional wrestler (d. 2004)
 June 1 – Morgan Freeman, American actor and director
 June 2 – Sally Kellerman, American actress and singer (d. 2022)
 June 10 – Luciana Paluzzi, Italian actress
 June 11 – Johnny Brown (actor), American actor and singer (d. 2022)
 June 14 – Jørgen Leth, Danish director
 June 16 – Charmian May, English character actress (d. 2002)
 June 26 – Sombat Metanee, Thai actor and film director (d. 2022)
 June 28 – Richard Bright (actor), American actor (d. 2006)
 July 2 – Polly Holliday, American retired actress
 July 6 – Ned Beatty, American character actor (d. 2021)
 July 12 – Bill Cosby, American stand-up comedian and actor
 July 16 – Ada Rogovtseva, Ukrainian actress
 July 20
Ken Ogata, Japanese actor (d. 2008)
Timothy Scott (actor, born 1937), American actor (d. 1995)
 July 21 – Gray Frederickson, American film producer (d. 2022)
 July 25 – Paul Collins (actor), British actor
 July 28 – Viktor Merezhko, Russian screenwriter, actor, writer and television presenter (d. 2022)
 August 3 – Steven Berkoff, British actor and playwright
 August 5 – Alan Howard (actor), English actor (d. 2015)
 August 6 – Barbara Windsor, English comedy actress (d. 2020)
 August 8 – Dustin Hoffman, American actor
 August 14
Fran Bennett, American actress (d. 2021)
Alberta Nelson, American actress (d. 2006)
 August 15 – Ella Mitchell, American Actress
 August 16 – Lorraine Gary, American retired actress
 August 19 – Evadne Baker, English actress (d. 1995)
 August 26 – Kenji Utsumi, Japanese actor (d. 2013)
 September 1 – Tsai Chin (actress), Chinese actress, singer and director
 September 4
Mikk Mikiver, Estonian actor and director (d. 2006)
Nicholas Worth, American character actor (d. 2007)
 September 6 – Jo Anne Worley, American actress, comedian and singer
 September 7
 Cüneyt Arkın, Turkish film actor, producer and director (d. 2022)
John Phillip Law, American actor (d. 2008)
 September 10 – Brian Murray, South African actor and theatre director (d. 2018)
 September 13
 Don Bluth, American director and producer
 Meeli Sööt, Estonian actress
 September 21
 Ron Cobb, American-Australian graphic and film designer (d. 2020)
 Aarne Üksküla, Estonian actor (d. 2017)
 October 7 – Clive Graham, British actor (d. 2007)
 October 10 – Vic Tablian, Armenian-British actor
 October 11 – Ron Leibman, American actor (d. 2019)
 October 15 – Linda Lavin, American actress and singer
 October 21 – Édith Scob, French actress (d. 2019)
 October 22 – Alan Ladd Jr., American film producer (d. 2022)
 November 4 – Loretta Swit, American actress
 November 5 – Harris Yulin, American actor
 November 17 – Peter Cook, English satirist and comedic actor (d. 1995)
 November 21
Ingrid Pitt, Polish-born British actress (d. 2010)
Marlo Thomas, American actress and producer
 November 23 – Dora Cadavid, Colombian actress, singer and announcer (d. 2022)
 November 27 – Rodney Bewes, English actor (d. 2017)
 November 30 – Ridley Scott, English director and producer
 December 4 – Max Baer Jr., American actor, producer, comedian and director
 December 7 – Kenneth Colley, English actor
 December 9 – Darwin Joston, American actor (d. 1998)
 December 12 - Connie Francis, American singer and actress
 December 16 – Joyce Bulifant, American actress
 December 21 – Jane Fonda, American actress
 December 29 – Barbara Steele, English actress
 December 30 – Zaldy Zshornack, Filipino actor (d. 2002)
 December 31 – Anthony Hopkins, Welsh actor

Deaths
 January 2 – Ross Alexander, 29, American actor, Captain Blood, A Midsummer Night's Dream, Flirtation Walk
 January 23 – Marie Prevost, 40, Canadian-born American actress, The Marriage Circle, The Racket, The Godless Girl, Cain and Mabel
 February 3 – Marija Leiko, 49, Latvian film actress, The Green Alley, The Rats
 May 1 – Snitz Edwards, 69, Austro-Hungarian-born American actor, The Thief of Bagdad, The Phantom of the Opera, Seven Chances, College
 May 10 – William Tedmarsh, 61, English-American silent film actor 
 June 7
Jean Harlow, 26, American actress, The Public Enemy, Libeled Lady, Suzy, Red Dust
Monroe Owsley, 37, American actor, Holiday, Indiscreet, The Keyhole, Ex-Lady
 June 25  – Colin Clive, 37, British actor, Frankenstein, Bride of Frankenstein
 September 21 – Osgood Perkins, 45, American actor, Scarface, Gold Diggers of 1937
 November 13 – Mrs. Leslie Carter, 75, American stage and screen actress, Becky Sharp, Rocky Mountain Mystery
 December 21 – Ted Healy, 41, American actor and creator of The Three Stooges, San Francisco, Mad Love, Beer and Pretzels, Soup to Nuts

Debuts
 Mel Blanc – Porky the Wrestler
 Broderick Crawford – Woman Chases Man
 Laraine Day – Stella Dallas
 Richard Farnsworth – A Day at the Races
 Glenn Ford – Night in Manhattan
 Susan Hayward – Hollywood Hotel
 Wendy Hiller – Lancashire Luck
 Carole Landis – The King and the Chorus Girl
 Donald O'Connor – It Can't Last Forever
 Ronald Reagan – Love Is on the Air
 Sabu – Elephant Boy
 Lana Turner – They Won't Forget

References

Sources

 
Film by year